The Danyang Woo clan (Hangul: 단양 우씨, Hanja: 丹陽 禹氏) is a Korean clan. Their Bon-gwan is in Danyang County, North Chungcheong Province. According to the 2015 census, the number of members was 191,287. Their founder is  who was a descendant of Yu the Great. Woo Jung-dae, Woo Hyeon’s 6th generation descendant, held the position of munhasijung (門下侍中), and he officially began the Danyang Woo clan.

See also 
 Korean clan names of foreign origin

References

External links 
 

 
U clans
Korean clan names of Chinese origin